is a video game developed by Dimps and Bandai Namco Entertainment featuring the characters and story of Masami Kurumada's Saint Seiya manga. It was released for the PlayStation 3 on October 17, 2013 in Japan, November 21, 2013 in Australia, November 22, 2013 in Europe and November 26, 2013 in North America, and it is also the first Saint Seiya game to be released in North America.

An updated version, Saint Seiya: Soldiers' Soul, was announced on April 12, 2015 and released on September 25 in Japan and Europe and worldwide on October 6.

Gameplay
Brave Soldiers is a fighting game featuring over 50 characters from the Saint Seiya manga. The  game mode has the player progress through battles based on the three main arcs of the original manga: the Sanctuary arc, the Poseidon arc, and the Hades arc. Also in the game is the  mode, a tournament mode.

Playable characters
Many of the playable characters have multiple forms that are separate playable characters, each with unique move sets and Big Bang Attacks.

Bronze Saints
Pegasus Seiya (CV: Masakazu Morita)
Original Bronze Cloth
New Bronze Cloth
Gold New Bronze Cloth (DLC)
Final Bronze Cloth
Sagittarius Seiya
Odin Seiya (DLC)
God Cloth
New Bronze Cloth Original Color Edition (Exclusive Seiya Edition DLC)
Training Wear (DLC)
Plain Clothes (DLC)
Final Bronze Cloth Original Color Edition (DLC)
God Cloth Original Color Edition (DLC)
Dragon Shiryū (CV: Takahiro Sakurai)
Original Bronze Cloth
No Cloth
New Bronze Cloth
Gold New Bronze Cloth (DLC)
Final Bronze Cloth
Libra Shiryū
Plain Clothes (DLC)
Final Bronze Cloth Original Color Edition (DLC)
Cygnus Hyoga (CV: Hiroaki Miura)
Original Bronze Cloth
New Bronze Cloth
Gold New Bronze Cloth (DLC)
Final Bronze Cloth
Aquarius Hyoga
Plain Clothes (DLC)
Final Bronze Cloth Original Color Edition (DLC)
Andromeda Shun (CV: Yuuta Kasuya)
Original Bronze Cloth
New Bronze Cloth
Gold New Bronze Cloth (DLC)
Final Bronze Cloth
Virgo Shun (DLC)
Plain Clothes (DLC)
Final Bronze Cloth Original Color Edition (DLC)
Phoenix Ikki (CV: Katsuyuki Konishi)
Original Bronze Cloth
New Bronze Cloth
Gold New Bronze Cloth (DLC)
Final Bronze Cloth
Leo Ikki (DLC)
Plain Clothes (DLC)
Final Bronze Cloth Original Color Edition (DLC)
Unicorn Jabu (CV: Hideo Ishikawa)
Hydra Ichi (CV: Masaya Onosaka)
Silver Saints
Eagle Marin (CV: Fumiko Inoue)
Training Wear (DLC)
Ophiuchus Shaina (CV: Yuka Komatsu)
Training Wear (DLC)
Lyra Orphée (CV: Hiroshi Kamiya)

Gold Saints
Aries Mu (CV: Takumi Yamazaki)
Plain Clothes (DLC)
Taurus Aldebaran (CV: Tesshō Genda)
Gemini ???/Gemini Saga (CV: Ryōtarō Okiayu)
Gemini Kanon (CV: Ryōtarō Okiayu)
Cancer Deathmask (CV: Ryōichi Tanaka)
Leo Aiolia (CV: Hideyuki Tanaka)
Training Wear (DLC)
Virgo Shaka (CV: Yūji Mitsuya)
Libra Dohko (CV: Kenyu Horiuchi)
Scorpio Milo (CV: Toshihiko Seki)
Sagittarius Aiolos (CV: Yusaku Yara)
Training Wear (DLC)
Capricorn Shura (CV: Takeshi Kusao)
Gold Cloth Original Color Edition (DLC)
Aquarius Camus (CV: Nobutoshi Kanna)
Plain Clothes (DLC)
Pisces Aphrodite (CV: Keiichi Nanba)
Former Aries Shion (CV: Nobuo Tobita) (Pre-order DLC)
Mariners
Sea Horse Baian (CV: Sho Hayami)
Siren Sorrento (CV: Yoku Shioya)
Chrysaor Krishna (CV: Masaharu Sato)
Scylla Io (CV: Issei Futamata)
Lyumnades Caça (CV: Keaton Yamada)
Kraken Isaac (CV: Ryusei Nakao)
Sea Dragon Kanon (CV: Ryōtarō Okiayu)
Plain Clothes (DLC)
Specters
Aries Shion (Surplice) (CV: Nobuo Tobita)
Gemini Saga (Surplice) (CV: Ryōtarō Okiayu)
Cancer Deathmask (Surplice) (CV: Ryōichi Tanaka)
Capricorn Shura (Surplice) (CV: Takeshi Kusao)
Aquarius Camus (Surplice) (CV: Nobutoshi Kanna)
Pisces Aphrodite (Surplice) (CV: Keiichi Nanba)
Wyvern Rhadamanthys (CV: Takehito Koyasu)
Garuda Aiacos (CV: Shin-ichiro Miki)
Griffon Minos (CV: Kōichi Tōchika)
Gods
Poseidon (CV: Keiichi Nanba)
Tuxedo (DLC)
Hades (CV: Akio Ōtsuka)
Thanatos (CV: Toshio Furukawa)
Hypnos (CV: Issei Futamata)

Reception 

The game received "mixed" reviews according to the review aggregation website Metacritic. In Japan, Famitsu gave it a score of two eights and two sevens for a total of 30 out of 40.

Grant E. Gaines of Hardcore Gamer said that "while the single player offers a decent experience, the dumb AI and simple mechanics will limit your fun." Adam Ma of Gaming Union praised the game for its emulation of the anime series. However, he also highlighted that this same quality was also its main weakness: "Brave Soldiers is not a game designed to be balanced, but rather a game designed to emulate the show with the greatest accuracy possible."

References

External links

 

2013 video games
Martial arts video games
Dimps games
Bandai Namco games
PlayStation 3 games
PlayStation 3-only games
Saint Seiya video games
Video games based on Greek mythology
Video games developed in Japan
Multiplayer and single-player video games